Einar Schwartz-Nielsen (3 October 1883 – 10 March 1939) was a Danish fencer. He competed in the individual sabre event at the 1908 Summer Olympics.

References

External links
 

1883 births
1939 deaths
Danish male fencers
Olympic fencers of Denmark
Fencers at the 1908 Summer Olympics
People from Randers
Sportspeople from the Central Denmark Region